South Pointe is the name of the following locations:

South Pointe Drive – Frenchman's Creek Bridge, in Grosse Ile, Michigan
South Pointe High School (Phoenix, Arizona)
South Pointe High School (Rock Hill, South Carolina)
South Pointe Middle School, in Diamond Bar, California
South Pointe Park, in Miami Beach, Florida